Coonshuck Creek is a stream in the U.S. state of Mississippi.

Coonshuck Creek is a name most likely derived from the Choctaw language; it's purported to mean "reed brake". A variant name is "Coonshark Creek".

References

Rivers of Mississippi
Rivers of Neshoba County, Mississippi
Mississippi placenames of Native American origin